The 6th Abia State House of Assembly Ended on 6 June 2019 after the House Valedictory Session Presided over by the Former Speaker Rt. Hon Chikwendu Kalu. Formed after an election in April 2015 and inaugurated on 11 June 2015, the Representatives of the Assembly were elected from 24 constituencies with the majority being members of the People's Democratic Party. The last elected Speaker was Chikwendu Kalu representing Isiala Ngwa South Constituency.

Leadership

Members

References

Abia State House of Assembly